PBA Bowling is a 1995 bowling sports-based video game from Bethesda Softworks. A sequel, PBA Tour Bowling 2, was released in 2000.

Reception

GameSpot gave the game a 6.2 of 10 stating "I'm sure there are people out there saying “Yeah, football and baseball are great, but when is a bowling game for the PC coming out?” Well, here it is. And, if you're a die-hard bowler, it's probably all you hoped for. For the rest of us, though, PBA Bowling leaves a little to be desired."

PC Gamer gave the game a 70% of 100 stating " PBA is one of a king simulation and great fun for fans of sport-but you may tire of the solo action before the beer frame"

Peter Scisco from CNET recommended the game stating "There's no lounge, either. So even if the PBA Bowling is enough sports action for you, you still have an excuse to get out to the lanes. Either way you look at, it's best to download a demo first to see for yourself" 

According to Pete Hines, Director of Marketing and Public Relations at Bethesda, the game is the best-selling bowling game of all time.

References

1995 video games
Bethesda Softworks games
Bowling video games
Professional Bowlers Association
Video games developed in the United States
Windows games
Windows-only games